John Bonar Dunlop ARBS (1916–1992) was a New Zealand artist, sculptor, and illustrator who excelled at figurative work. He became mainly known for his sculptures of New Zealand and Welsh rugby players.

Born in Dunedin, the son of Francis Dunlop, who lectured in moral philosophy at the University of Otago and who was also a Presbyterian minister, he grew up on the family farm. Shona Dunlop MacTavish (1920–2019) was his younger sister. At the farm, Dunlop learned to ride proficiently and developed a love of horses that never left him, clearly visible in his later sculptures and illustrations. After the death of his father in his teens, the family moved to Europe, settling in Vienna in the mid-1930s. With the political turmoil of Central Europe, after two years they moved on to Paris. Dunlop then continued to London to study at the Royal Academy Schools, where he won the prestigious Landseer Prize.

This was interrupted in 1939 when he volunteered to serve in Finland's short-lived 'Winter War', where his horse-riding abilities paid off. While trapped by World War II in Scandinavia, he attended art school in Stockholm for a year before attempting an escape on horseback via the Arctic Circle. This failed when he and a companion were arrested, but he eventually regained Britain by plane.
There he joined the Royal Air Force and trained as a pilot in South Africa before flying on operations from bases in North Africa.

After the war, in 1946, he moved to Sydney to join some of his family and attended Sydney Technical College. Here, in 1947, he married his teenage sweetheart from Vienna, Hilary Lennox Napier, an English dancer, and began a successful career as an illustrator. Until 1958-9 they lived in an extraordinary house in Whale Beach, where they had two children. He was the subject of Arthur Murch's portrait, which won the 1949 Archibald Prize.  In 1959 the family moved definitively to London where Dunlop thrived further as an illustrator, contributing to numerous high visibility advertising campaigns (Harrods, Rothmans, Lee Cooper, etc.).

Since his time in Australia he had often worked on book illustration, very much the 1950s vogue, and in the 1960s he provided new covers and internal illustrations for Ruby Ferguson's Jill books - Jill's Gymkhana, Jill's Riding Club, A Stable for Jill - and later the paperback versions of the books.

Although his primary career was as an illustrator and commercial artist, his real passion was for sculpture, and in the early 1970s he became a full-time sculptor, creating sporting pieces, primarily of rugby players. His first one-man show was in London in 1975, and he subsequently exhibited at the Academy of Fine Arts in Wellington and in Dunedin. Other shows followed in Edinburgh and Wales, and he was commissioned to do numerous portraits of sports personalities for trophies and private collections.
After living in north London, Dunlop and his wife spent the latter part of their lives between a house in Mojácar, Spain, and Sussex, England, where he died on his 76th birthday.

In 2002 an exhibition of his lively sketches and drawings, 1936–45, was held at the Galerie Beckel-Odille-Boicos in Paris, and in 2004 a major exhibition of his rugby sculptures and sketches was held at the Museum of Rugby in Twickenham.

References

External links
 Books illustrated by (or with covers by) Bonar Dunlop, www.janebadgerbooks.co.uk
 Photo of Dunlop's Bronze statue: Aerial Challenge, liveauctioneers.com
 Photo of Dunlop's bust of Gareth Edwards, artsalesindex.artinfo.com
 Dunlop's Women's Weekly cover of the 1954 Royal Visit, books.google.com.au
 Six Bonar Dunlop illustrations from the 1960s, www.milescollins.com

1916 births
1992 deaths
20th-century New Zealand sculptors
20th-century New Zealand male artists
Associates of the Royal British Society of Sculptors